Acleros sparsum is a butterfly in the family Hesperiidae first described by Hamilton Herbert Druce in 1909. It is found in Cameroon and the Democratic Republic of the Congo (from the eastern part of the country to the Ituri Forest).

References

Butterflies described in 1890
Erionotini
Butterflies of Africa